A Sommerfeld expansion is an approximation method developed by Arnold Sommerfeld for a certain class of integrals which are common in condensed matter and statistical physics.  Physically, the integrals represent statistical averages using the Fermi–Dirac distribution.

Application to the free electron model 
Integrals of this type appear frequently when calculating electronic properties, like the heat capacity, in the free electron model of solids. In these calculations the above integral expresses the expected value of the quantity . Therefore, the Sommerfeld expansion is valid for large  (low temperature) systems.

Derivation to second order in temperature
Begin with a change variables to :

Divide the range of integration, and rewrite  using the change of variables :

to obtain:

Combine  to obtain:

to obtain,

The definite integral is known to be:

.

Hence,

Higher order terms and a generating function

We can obtain higher order terms in the Sommerfeld expansion by use of a 
generating function for moments of the Fermi distribution. This is given by 
 
Here  and Heaviside step function  subtracts the divergent zero-temperature contribution.
Expanding in powers of     gives, for example 

A similar generating function for the odd moments of the Bose function is

Notes

References

Equations of physics
Statistical mechanics
Particle statistics